The African Artistic Gymnastics Championships were first held in 1990.

In the women's individual all-around event, three medals are awarded: gold for first place, silver for second place, and bronze for third place.

Medalists

References

All-around artistic gymnastics